The Washington Peace Center was a nonprofit organization founded and located in Washington, D.C., focusing on peace and social justice. It officially closed ceased operating in 2020 after. 

The organization sought to provide education, support, and resources to activist groups. The Peace Center aimed to strategically link organizations to establish "structures and relationships that are nonviolent, non-hierarchical, humane and just."

The organization traces its roots to a group of activists led by Quaker Larry Scott who began a vigil to protest the development of biological and chemical weapons at Fort Detrick in 1959. In 1961, the group moved to Washington, D.C., and expanded their work to include peace education by organizing film screenings and discussions and publishing a local newspaper. It was formally organized as the Washington Peace Center in 1963.

History
The Washington Peace Center grew from The Vigil to Stop Biological Weapons at Fort Detrick, which was maintained in Frederick, Maryland, from 1959 through 1961. In 1961 vigil coordinator Larry Scott and other vigilers moved to the nation's capital to start the Washington Peace Action Center. Activists from the Peace Action Center  vigiled at the White House calling for a ban on all testing of nuclear weapons, a major Cold War issue at that time. The PAC also contributed to local mobilizing for the 1963 March on Washington for Jobs and Justice.

The ratification of the Partial Test Ban Treaty between the US, USSR and Great Britain led to the dissolution of The Peace Action Center in 1963.  Left in its place was the Washington Peace Center, a non-profit organization housed (until 1997) in the Friends Meeting of Washington and initially directed by Gelston MacNeil, a Quaker pacifist and activist. The Center sought to educate the public on peace issues through film screenings, discussions, and the publication of a local newsletter.

The Peace Center quickly became a hub for organizing against the Vietnam War and helped to coordinate draft counseling in the Washington area.  During the 1970s the Center continued its work by supporting the movements against nuclear power and for nuclear disarmament.  In the 1980s the Peace Center served as the local nexus for national and international opposition to the arms race and played a vital role in organizing resistance to the Reagan administration's interventions in Central America.  The 1990s saw the Center contributing to social justice movements in opposition to racism and for justice for gay, lesbian, and transgender people.  In the 2000s, the Center was involved with opposing the invasion and occupation of Iraq, countering military recruiters and attempting to institute a peace curriculum in area public schools, as well as working to close the Guantanamo Bay prison camp, ending torture and restoring civil liberties at home. Currently, the Peace Center fiscally sponsors several activist organizations in Washington D.C. including Witness Against Torture, the Fort Reno Summer Concert Series, the Hiroshima-Nagasaki Peace Committee, Positive Force, and the Civilian-Soldier Alliance, allowing these groups to raise funds without 501(c)(3) status. The Center organizes and hosts monthly skillshares as part of the DC Trainers Network in order to strengthen progressive social movements in Washington D.C. As the Center's current website states, the summation of all of these efforts is that, "We envision a world based on respect for people and the planet that is achieved through nonviolence, peace and social justice."

As a local grassroots organization working in the political milieu of Washington, DC, the Peace Center has always faced the unique challenge of balancing the competing impulses of national organizations oriented toward using Washington as a stage for major demonstrations with the concerns of local activists working to confront the symptoms of global injustice in the environs of DC. Entering into its fifth decade, the Center is a not-for-profit organization with an eleven-member board of directors. The Center works on a variety of peace and social justice issues locally, nationally, and globally. The Center publishes the "Washington Peace Letter" bi-annually. It distributes the free publication to libraries, coffee shops and other public places throughout the District of Columbia and mails the publication to its members throughout the greater Washington metropolitan area.

Currently the Center has three staff members, Sonia Silbert, Darakshan Raja, and Candice Jones. Activists who served on the Center's staff in earlier years include Abe Bloom, David Goodman, Joe Miller, Jane Midgely, Elise Fisher, Til Bartels, Michele Guimarin, David Hostetter, Lisa Fithian, Mark Anderson, Benito Torres, Phillis Engelbert, Christine Rice, Tammi Coles, Vicki Linton, Luci Murphy, Jennifer Carr, John Judge, Maria Ramos, Brian Anders, Paul Magno, Asantewaa Nkrumah-Toure, Mkawasi Mcharo, Pete Perry, Dany Sigwalt, and Jay Marx.

Records

The records of the Vigil at Fort Detrick, the Washington Peace Action Center, and the Washington Peace Center are housed at the Swarthmore College Peace Collection (http://www.swarthmore.edu/library/peace/).

References

Further reading 
 David Hostetter, "Experiment In Persuasion: The Vigil to Stop Biological Weapons at Fort Detrick, 1959-1961, and Antiwar Protest in the 1960s," in Michael A. and Barbara M. Powell,eds., Mid-Maryland History: Conflict, Growth and Change, (Charleston: The History Press, 2008). 143-193.
 The Washington Post, A Hunger for Justice, Darfur Becomes One Man's Cause for Deprivation, by Delphine Schrank, Washington Post, April 14, 2007, C01.
 The People's Voice, Marine Mom Arrested at Speaker Pelosi’s Office, April 2007.
 The Washington Post, Veteran Questions Ethics of War Policies, by Sylvia Moreno, Washington Post, August 29, 2007, B06.

External links 
 Washington Peace Center

Peace organizations based in the United States
Anti-nuclear organizations based in the United States
Anti–Vietnam War groups
Non-profit organizations based in Washington, D.C.